John Stonhouse may refer to:

 Sir John Stonhouse, 2nd Baronet (creation of 1628)
 Sir John Stonhouse, 5th Baronet (d. 1681), of the Stonhouse baronets of Amberden Hall
 Sir John Stonhouse, 2nd Baronet (creation of 1670) (1639-1700)
 Sir John Stonhouse, 3rd Baronet (c. 1672-1733), MP for Berkshire
 Sir John Stonhouse, 6th Baronet (d. 1740), of the Stonhouse baronets
 Sir John Stonhouse, 7th Baronet (c. 1710-c. 1767) (had succeeded in the baronetcy of 1670 in 1733), of the Stonhouse baronets
 Sir John Stonhouse, 8th Baronet (d. c. 1770), of the Stonhouse baronets
 Sir John Brooke Stonhouse, 13th Baronet (c. 1797-1848), of the Stonhouse baronets

See also
 John Harrison Stonehouse (1864–1937), English bookseller and Charles Dickens scholar
 John Stonehouse (1925–1988), politician
Stonehouse (TV series) British TV series based on the life of the above